David Alexander Sharp Sisi (born 5 February 1993) is a German-born Italian professional rugby union player who primarily plays lock for Zebre Parma of the United Rugby Championship. He has also represented Italy at international level, having made his test debut against Scotland during the 2019 Six Nations Championship. Sisi has previously played for clubs such as London Irish, London Scottish, Bath, and Leeds Tykes in the past.

Early life 
Sisi is of Italian descent, and qualifies to play for Italy through his paternal grandparents and his father Carlo. His mother, Barbara, is English. He has a younger brother, Adam.

As a youngster he swam representing his county. Rugby was introduced to him at secondary school, aged 11. He joined local club, Tottonians and was picked by Hampshire RFU. At 16, he was offered a place on the London Irish AASE scheme; joining the London Irish academy and completing his schooling part time at St. Paul’s college, and afterwards accepting a full time contract with London Irish; at the time becoming their youngest player to represent their first team. With the England under 20 team, David won both the 6 Nations twice and a first Junior World Cup for England at the time.

Professional career 
Sisi moved to Bath where over the course of 4 years he also spent loan periods to Yorkshire Carnegie (formally Leeds Carnegie), London Scottish and back to London Irish.

On 31 July 2017, Sisi signed for Italian club Zebre in the Pro14 from the 2017-18 season.

In 2012 and 2013, Sisi was named in the England Under 20 squad, but in 2019 he opted for Italy and on 18 August 2019, he was named in the final 31-man squad for the 2019 Rugby World Cup.

References

External links 

Dave Sisi at European Professional Club Rugby
Dave Sisi at Bath Rugby
Dave Sisi at Zebre Parma

English rugby union players
Italian rugby union players
Bath Rugby players
Living people
1993 births
Italian British rugby union players
People from Rinteln
Rugby union players from Southampton
Italy international rugby union players
London Irish players
London Scottish F.C. players
Leeds Tykes players
Zebre Parma players
Rugby union flankers